Rita Lopes de Almeida (5 March 1848 – 6 January 1913) – in religion Rita Beloved of Jesus (Portuguese: Rita Amada de Jesus) – was a Portuguese religious sister and the foundress of the Jesus Mary Joseph Institute. She spread the faith in the spirit of evangelization across Portugal despite a period of anti-religious sentiment and even received some intimidating threats during the course of her apostolate due to this; her order was dedicated to tending to girls and it ferried them off to their parents when anti-religious sentiment intensified.

Her beatification was celebrated in mid-2006 in her native Portugal.

Life
Rita Lopes de Almeida was born on 5 March 1848 as the fourth of five children to Manuel Lopes and Josefa de Jesus Almeida. Her baptism was celebrated on the following 13 March. She would recite rosaries each night with her parents and siblings over the course of her childhood.

She spent a brief period of time with the Benedictine nuns at Viseu and travelled from parish to parish to encourage people to make their faith an integral part of their lives. This saw men propose to her – though she refused each offer – and she even received death threats for her active apostolate. In 1877 she joined the sole functioning religious order, at that time – the Sisters of Charity – but did not find it to be fulfilling so left it. On 24 September 1880 she founded the Jesus Mary Joseph Institute in order to dedicate her time to the care of poor and abandoned girls. In 1910 – after the establishment of the Republic of Portugal – there was a period of persecution of Christians and so with the religious sisters managed to move the children their parents before something violent ensured.

She had an intense devotion to both Saint Joseph and the Sacred Heart of Jesus. She also harbored an admiration for Pope Pius IX and saw similarities between the situation in her homeland to the suffering the pope underwent at the time. Her order later received on 10 May 1902 the papal approval of Pope Leo XIII.

Almeida died in 1913 after a period of ill health.

Beatification
The process for beatification commenced on 2 September 1991, after the Congregation for the Causes of Saints issued the official "nihil obstat" to the cause and therefore titled her as a Servant of God while the diocesan process opened on 4 December 1991 and concluded on 23 October 1994; this process later received full C.C.S. validation on 7 April 1995, while the C.C.S. received the official Positio dossier from the postulation in 1997. the congress of the theologians met on 13 May 2003 and issued their approval to the cause, while on 11 November 2003 the C.C.S. itself also voted in favor of the cause; Pope John Paul II proclaimed Almeida to be Venerable on 20 December 2003, after he confirmed that the late religious had indeed lived a model life of heroic virtue.

The process for the single miracle needed for her beatification was investigated from 27 July 1998 until its closure on 13 August 1998, while later receiving C.C.S. validation on 19 February 1999. A medical board issued approval for it on 11 March 2004, while theologians also approved it on 7 September 2004, as did the C.C.S. on 9 November 2004. John Paul II issued final approval on 20 December 2004, which paved the path for her beatification, which took place on 28 May 2006 in Portugal; Cardinal José Saraiva Martins presided on behalf of Pope Benedict XVI.

The current postulator for this cause is Paolo Vilotta.

References

External links
Vatican Profile: Rita Amada de Jesus
Hagiography Circle
Saints SQPN
Jesus Mary Joseph Institute

1848 births
1913 deaths
19th-century Portuguese nuns
19th-century venerated Christians
20th-century Portuguese nuns
20th-century venerated Christians
Beatifications by Pope Benedict XVI
Founders of Catholic religious communities
Portuguese beatified people
Portuguese Roman Catholic saints
People from Viseu
Venerated Catholics by Pope John Paul II